This is a list of female cabinet ministers in Finland.
There have been total 79 female cabinet ministers out of 574 ministers. Out of 79 female ministers three have served as Prime Minister.

Political party table

List

References

Finland
Cabinet
+Women
Cabinet